The 1921 Tour de France was the 15th edition of Tour de France, one of cycling's Grand Tours. The Tour began in Paris with a flat stage on 26 June, and Stage 9 occurred on 12 July with a mountainous stage from Toulon. The race finished in Paris on 24 July.

Stage 9
12 July 1921 — Toulon to Nice,

Stage 10
14 July 1921 — Nice to Grenoble,

Stage 11
16 July 1921 — Grenoble to Geneva,

Stage 12
18 July 1921 — Geneva to Strasbourg,

Stage 13
20 July 1921 — Strasbourg to Metz,

Stage 14
22 July 1921 — Metz to Dunkerque,

Stage 15
24 July 1921 — Dunkerque to Paris,

References

1921 Tour de France
Tour de France stages